This is a list of George Floyd protests in Minnesota. The protests began as local protests in Minneapolis–Saint Paul the day after George Floyd was murdered during an arrest in Minneapolis on May 25, 2020, before reaching other locations in the U.S. state of Minnesota, the United States, and internationally. The events are ongoing.

Background 

In the years prior to the murder of George Floyd, Minneapolis had seen several police officer-involved shootings and subsequent protests. In 2015, the shooting of Jamar Clark resulted in no repercussions for the Minneapolis Police Department (MPD) officers involved, and in 2016, the shooting of Philando Castile in nearby Falcon Heights resulted in a jury acquittal for an involved officer. In 2017, the shooting of Justine Damond, by a black police officer, resulted in a twelve-and-a-half-year prison sentence. After Floyd's murder, Minneapolis residents responded to the buildup of unanswered grievances and the lack of concrete changes to living conditions due to structural racism.

Locations

Albert Lea 
On June 2, hundreds of protesters rallied for police accountability at the Freeborn County Courthouse and then marched around town despite severely hot weather. Director of Public Safety JD Carlson told protesters that he did not support Chauvin's actions against Floyd in Minneapolis, and offered an open door between the community and the police department. Freeborn County Sheriff Kurt Freitag expressed concern for the protesters, and recommended that they come prepared with water and sun protection if protesting in summer.

Anoka 
On June 1, dozens of protesters gathered near the Rum River Bridge to peacefully protest the murder of George Floyd. Anoka County Sheriff James Stuart spoke in support of the protest. Several local officials attended the event, including Minnesota State Senator Jim Abeler.

Austin 
On May 31, approximately 300 protesters rallied at Bandshell Community Park and marched to the law enforcement center before returning to the park and disbanding. Another protest occurred on the July 25.

Bemidji 
On May 30, between 300 and 500 protesters marched from Paul Bunyan Park to the Bemidji Police Department; the demonstration was peaceful until some protesters attacked a D.A.R.E. truck, which then backed into a crowd of demonstrators and mildly injured an event volunteer. After the protest, mayor Rita Albrecht signed a declaration of a curfew between 8:00 p.m. and 6:00 a.m.

Bloomington 
On July 5, the  10K Foundation organized a march from the Mall of America in Bloomington to the George Floyd memorial site in downtown Minneapolis.

Brainerd 
On May 29, over 60 people gathered at a busy intersection in Brainerd to support Black Lives Matter and protest the murder of George Floyd.

Duluth 
On May 28, around 100 protesters blocked traffic at a busy intersection to protest the murder of George Floyd. On May 30, several hundred protesters temporarily blocked portions of Interstate 35. Several highways closed, including Interstate 35, Interstate 394, Interstate 94 and Highway 55. A curfew from 10 p.m. CDT through 6 p.m. CDT Sunday morning was imposed by Duluth city leaders.

On May 31, more than 1,000 protesters marched on I-35. Eight properties were damaged including an expletive written on the ground below the Clayton Jackson McGhie Memorial for historical lynching victims.

On June 19, hundreds marched in Duluth for Juneteenth.

Ely 
On June 6, in Ely, approximately 250 protesters marched down Chapman Street from Central Avenue to Whiteside Park in support of Black Lives Matter. The protest was peaceful with no incidents of violence. Once arriving at the park, most protesters kneeled in silence for 8 minutes 46 seconds.

Grand Marais 
On May 29, roughly 80 protesters lined Highway 61 in Grand Marais to protest police brutality. The rally remained peaceful.

Glencoe 
On June 2, close to 150 protesters attended a rally outside the McLeod County Courthouse in Glencoe.

Mankato 
On May 29, hundreds of protesters marched through downtown Mankato in a peaceful demonstration. The rally began at Veterans Memorial Bridge and went through Washington park and to the Mankato Public Safety Center.

Marshall 
On June 3, a crowd of over 200 people marched down East College Drive from Memorial Park in downtown Marshall and then back down East College Drive and through downtown. The protest remained peaceful and was a major emphasis by the organizers of the protest despite several local businesses closing early in anticipation of the protests.

Minneapolis–Saint Paul 

The first George Floyd protests took place in Minneapolis on May 26the day after his murder by Minneapolis police officersand spread to neighboring St. Paul. On May 28, after protests turned violent, Minneapolis Mayor Jacob Frey declared a state of emergency and Minnesota Governor Tim Walz activated the Minnesota National Guard. Demonstrations in Minneapolis–St. Paul are ongoing as protesters seek justice for Floyd and reform of policing, and have inspired protests and political action in Minnesota, the United States, and internationally.

On June 9, Minnesota Governor Tim Walz issued a statewide proclamation declaring 8 minutes 46 seconds of silence at 11:00 a.m. CDT to coincide with the beginning of Floyd's funeral in Houston, Texas. The length of time was how long Minneapolis police officer Derek Chauvin pinned Floyd on the pavement using his knee.

New Ulm 
Over a dozen people spontaneously gathered on May 30 and peacefully demonstrated.

Owatonna 
On May 31, over 200 protesters demonstrated along Hoffman Drive to show solidarity with George Floyd. They traveled to the Law Enforcement Center, where they spoke with officers from Owatonna and from neighboring counties. They also held a moment of silence for 8 minutes 46 seconds to honor Floyd.

Rochester 
On May 29, over 150 protesters marched from Soldiers Field to the Government Center building and back to protest the murder of George Floyd. On June 7, protesters marched from Silver Lake to the Olmsted County Government Center.

St. Cloud 
On May 29, after hundreds of people gathered for a memorial for George Floyd at Lake George Township, a portion of the crowd marched through downtown St. Cloud, stopping at the Stearns County Courthouse to hold a moment of silence for Floyd before turning back to Lake George.

Woodbury 
On June 1, a group of about 40 protesters gathered in Ojibway Park in Woodbury to rally against police brutality. Another protest took place on June 4 as protesters marched from Colby Lake to Woodbury City Hall.

See also

History of Minnesota
List of civil unrest in Minneapolis–Saint Paul

References

2020 in Minnesota
Minnesota
Riots and civil disorder in Minnesota